Molly Kerr (28 May 1904 – 31 May 1942) was an actor, producer and playwright who was the first person to play the role of Bunty Mainwaring in  Noël Coward's play The Vortex.

Early life
Kerr was born Frances Keen on 28 May 1904 in Kensington, London, to Frederick Grinham Keen (1858–1933), an actor who used the stage name Frederick Kerr, and Lucy Houghton Keen, née Dowson (1862–1941). Her elder brother was the actor, author and playwright Geoffrey Kemble Grinham Keen (1895–1971), who used the stage name Geoffrey Kerr, and her older sister was Lucy Joyce Gunning Keen (1897–1980), who acted under the stage name Joyce Kerr before marrying, in 1924, James Boswell Talbot, 3rd Baron Talbot de Malahide (1874–1948).

Kerr was educated at St Paul’s and Granville House School for Girls in Eastbourne. In about 1920 at the age of 16 she enrolled in the drama school run by Lady Constance Benson at Pembroke Gardens, Kensington, in London.

Career
Kerr made her stage debut aged 17 in 1921 in Threads by Frank Stayton playing Chloe, the daughter of a judge.  The play ran for 30 performances from 23 August 1921 at the St James's Theatre in London.

She gained wider notice in her next performance, as society girl Diana Oughterson, in The Faithful Heart by Monckton Hoffe, which opened at the Comedy Theatre in November 1921 and ran for 185 performances. This was followed by appearances in The Second Mrs Tanqueray by Arthur Pinero at the Playhouse Theatre in 1922; a spell touring with the theatre troupe of Mrs Patrick Campbell, as her father had done; and The Return of Sherlock Holmes by J. E. Harold Terry at the Princes Theatre, playing Lady Frances Carfax.

In 1924 Kerr played Bunty Mainwaring opposite Noël Coward in the first production of The Vortex. The play ran for 244 performances at four different theatres between November 1924 and June 1925. In September 1925 the play transferred to the US and had 157 performances, mostly at Henry Miller’s Theater in New York, where Coward, Lilian Braithwaite and Kerr repeated their roles until the play closed in January 1926. On her return to England Kerr played the part of Brenda Fallon in Loose Ends by Dion Titheradge, a play which also transferred to the US and opened at the Ritz Theatre in New York in November 1926.

In 1927, aged 23, Kerr became what was said to be the youngest ever female producer of stage plays when she produced The Intriguing Ladies with the play’s author, Frank Stayton, at the Q Theatre. Kerr then produced at the Arts Theatre the first play written by the novelist Audrey Lucas, called The Peaceful Thief. She also acted in both plays.

From January 1928 Kerr appeared in 149 performances of Two White Arms a farce by Harold Dearden at the Ambassadors Theatre, playing the wife, Alison Liston, and then in Loyalties by John Galsworthy in both Paris and London, playing Margaret Orme. In April 1929 she produced and acted in the only play that she wrote, called Requital, which had 15 performances at the Everyman Theatre in Hampstead. The part of Lucy Deren was played by Peggy Ashcroft.

Death
Kerr died suddenly in a nursing home in Hove on 31 May 1942, three days after her 38th birthday. She was buried in the graveyard of St Mary’s Church, Balcombe in Mid-Sussex, the village where she had been living with her mother, who had died the year before and is buried in the same grave.

References

External links
Portrait of Kerr in The Sketch at the National Portrait Gallery, London

1904 births
1942 deaths
20th-century English actresses
English stage actresses
British theatre managers and producers